NGC 684 is a spiral galaxy approximately 135 million light-years away from Earth in the constellation of Triangulum. It was discovered by William Herschel on October 26, 1786. Edward Swift, Lewis' son, found this galaxy again on 18 Jan 1890 while "searching for Swift's Comet." and it was reported as a new object in list IX-6.

See also 
 Spiral galaxy 
 List of NGC objects (1–1000)
 Triangulum (constellation)

References

External links 
 
 
 SEDS

Spiral galaxies
Triangulum (constellation)
684
6759
IC objects
Astronomical objects discovered in 1786
Discoveries by William Herschel